Firethorn is a 2004 fantasy novel by American writer Sarah Micklem.

Plot introduction
Firethorn, narrated by the protagonist of the same name, starts out as Luck, a 'mudfolk' orphan with unusually red hair serving an ageing noblewoman, the Dame, in a land where the division between high and lowborn is literally attributed to the gods. Too restless to live her fate as a drudge and too proud to accept the inevitable abuse that accompanies it after the Dame's death, Luck runs. A year in the mountains spent starving to death makes her desperate enough to eat the poisonous berries of the firethorn tree but instead of dying, she has a revelation that may well include a god-granted gift.

Emerging from the forest, calling herself Firethorn, she tries to return to civilisation, knowing she can never quite fit. In the Upside-Down Days (ten days when the high and lowborn trade places) she meets Sire Galan, a visiting lord who takes her as his lover. When he marches off to war and suggests she tag along as his 'sheath' (a woman that follows a soldier to war and shares his bed), she jumps at the chance just to get away. But life as a camp follower waiting for war may well be something that not even Firethorn can survive...

Plot summary

A mysterious foundling with unique red hair and strange god-given powers, Firethorn is condemned to life as a powerless servant—or so she believes, until one of King Thyrse's noblemen becomes her lover. But, as she accompanies Sire Galan to war, Firethorn discovers she may have traded one form of bondage for another. A soldier's mistress—even a high-born soldier's mistress—is despised as a "sheath," or camp follower. Also, Firethorn's nasty ex-overlord, Sire Pava, has joined the king's army, and she has made a new enemy in her lover's cousin and closest friend, the sadistic Sire Rodela. However, she and Galan share a fiery love that will surely overcome the opposition of both their personal enemies and their kingdom's enemies. Then Sire Galan makes a strange, heart-shattering wager that may not only ruin his honor, but get them both killed.

Characters in "Firethorn"

Firethorn - narrator, protagonist, Sir Galan's lover, the Dame's apprentice
Sire Galan - Firethorn's lover, King Thyrse's nobleman, a Cataphract of the Clan of Crux, Sir Pava's relative
The Dame - Firethorn's caretaker and teacher
Sire Rodela - Sire Galan's armiger
Sire Pava - Sire Galan's relative
Consort Vulpeja - Sire Galan's "wager"
Divine Xyster - Head of Sire Galan's clan
First of Crux - Clan of Crux head
Ardor Wildfire - God

Major themes
Tourney
Firethorn
War
Social classes
Death
Fictional places
Fasting
Exile
Servants

Release details
2004, USA, Scribner , Pub date 25 May 2004, hardcover (First edition)
2005, UK, Voyager , Pub date 4 April 2005, hardcover 
2005, UK, Voyager , Pub date ? March 2005, paperback
2005, USA, Spectra Books , Pub date 28 June 2005, paperback
2006, UK, Voyager , Pub date 4 April 2006, paperback (Mass market edition

External links
Jennifer Howell "Firethorn by Sarah Micklem"
Firethorn on Amazon.com, which quotes the Publishers Weekly review. 
Official Website

2004 American novels
American fantasy novels